"Lo and behold" is a phrase used to express wonder or surprise.

It may also refer to:

Lo and Behold, Reveries of the Connected World, 2016 American documentary film
Come Home Love: Lo and Behold, 2017 Hong Kong sitcom
"Lo and Beholden", Patti Smith song on her 2000 album Gung Ho

See also
Low and Behold, a 2007 American film